The Breeders' 2014 Tour comprised thirteen concerts in the central and western United States in September 2014. After the group's "classic" lineup reunited in 2013 for a tour commemorating the 20th anniversary of Last Splash, they began working on new material. Ahead of opening for Neutral Milk Hotel at the Hollywood Bowl, they planned a tour leading up to this show, using the opportunity to practice recent compositions that would appear on their 2018 album All Nerve.

Between September 2 and September 17, the Breeders performed in eleven cities, including St. Louis, Denver, Seattle, Portland, San Francisco, and Las Vegas. Support bands the Funs and the Neptunas opened for them at five and six of these shows, respectively. The group finished the tour on September 20 at the Goose Island 312 Urban Block Party event in Chicago. As well as new songs, they performed numerous selections from Last Splash and Pod. The tour received good reviews from critics; appraisal included comments that the performances were rousing, and that the band was as good as—or better than—in their heyday.

Background 
In 1993, the Breeders released their second album, Last Splash. At this time, the group's lineup consisted of sisters Kim and Kelley Deal on guitar and vocals, Josephine Wiggs on bass and vocals, and Jim Macpherson on drums. Last Splash was successful in various countries worldwide, and the group toured extensively and played at Lollapalooza 1994. In November 1994, Kelley Deal was arrested on drug-related charges, and Wiggs left the band in the mid-1990s and got involved in other musical projects. Macpherson continued playing with Kim Deal in her side-project group, the Amps, and then in the 1996 incarnation of the Breeders, but quit the band in 1997. The Breeders' lineups for their next two albums, Title TK (2002) and Mountain Battles (2008), included the Deal sisters, Mando Lopez, and Jose Medeles, as well as Richard Presley on Title TK. In 2013, Wiggs and Macpherson rejoined the Deals to tour the 20th anniversary of Last Splash—the LSXX Tour.

On December 31, 2013, the Breeders performed their final concert on the 60-date tour in Austin, Texas. The group enjoyed the LSXX concerts, and decided they would like to record new music together. Throughout 2014, Wiggs traveled from her home in Brooklyn, New York to Dayton, Ohio, near where Macpherson and both Deals lived. The group began practicing new material in Kim Deal's basement, including compositions by her and one by Wiggs. By August, there were three new songs they could play well, two less so, and others they had not yet practiced. Reported titles were "Skinhead #2", "Simone", "All Nerve", and "Launched". The band Neutral Milk Hotel asked the Breeders to open for them at a Hollywood Bowl concert to be held on September 18. The latter decided to go on a tour leading up to this show and to perform some new compositions in preparation for their eventual recording.

Performances and reception 

The September 2014 tour comprised thirteen American dates, all in western and central states. At various shows—between which the Breeders traveled by van—the Funs, the Neptunas, and Kelley Stoltz were the opening acts. The tour began in early September with dates in St. Louis and Kansas City, Missouri, and then continued west to Denver, Salt Lake City, and Garden City, Idaho. On September 10, the Breeders started a short Pacific Coast stretch, performing in Seattle, Portland, and San Francisco. These were followed by Las Vegas and Phoenix, then west again to San Diego, leading up to their concert on September 18 at the Hollywood Bowl with Neutral Milk Hotel and Daniel Johnston. Breeder's Digest, their official website, announced Carrie Bradley's reunion with the band for this show. Following the Hollywood concert, the Breeders finished their tour at the Goose Island 312 Urban Block Party event in Chicago on September 20, with groups such as Unknown Mortal Orchestra and Thao & the Get Down Stay Down.

In addition to the new compositions "Simone", "Skinhead #2", "All Nerve", and "Launched", the Breeders performed many songs from their albums Pod (1990) and Last Splash. Among these were "Saints", "Cannonball", "No Aloha", and "Divine Hammer" from Last Splash, as well as "Doe", "Happiness Is a Warm Gun", and "Iris" from Pod. They also played "Off You" from Title TK and the title track from the Safari EP (1992). Another composition they performed was "Walking with a Killer", which had originally been released in 2012—with the B-side "Dirty Hessians"—as the first in a series of solo 7" singles by Kim Deal, and which the Breeders had played in 2013 on their LSXX Tour.

The band's performances on the 2014 tour were generally well received. Regarding their September 3 concert in Kansas City, Danny Phillips of Blurt wrote that the Breeders "like wine, seem to improve with age", adding that nothing about the show could have been better; The Kansas City Stars Timothy Finn likewise summed the night up as "an evening that exceeded its promise". Critic Lissa Townsend Rodgers of the Vegas Seven website commended their rousing performances of "New Year" and "Cannonball" at their Las Vegas concert on September 16—a show also enjoyed by Leslie Ventura of Las Vegas Weekly, who noted the confidence with which the band played. Reviewing the September 17 date in San Diego, critic Alex Packard of Listensd.com opined that the Breeders "deliver[ed] the classics like they wrote them yesterday and new material in no less of a moving way". Both Keith Plocek of LA Weekly and Philip Cosores of Consequence of Sound liked the September 18 concert at the Hollywood Bowl; Cosores rated a few of the performances as impeccable, and commented that Kim Deal's "rock and roll soul is still as strong as ever".

Tim Hinely, also of Blurt, wrote that although the Breeders’ showing in Denver on September 5 could by no means be considered first rate, it was nonetheless enjoyable; in Portland on September 11, 94/7's Yume Delegato heard the group's performance as appealingly unpolished and heartfelt, but asserted that some of the new songs did not leave a strong impression.

Dates

Notes

Footnotes

References 

 
 
 
 
 
 
 
 
 
 
 
 
 
 
 
 
 
 
 
 
 
 
 
 
 
 
 
 
 
 
 
 
 
 
 
 
 
 
 
 
 
 
 
 
 
 
 
 
 
 
 

2014 concert tours
2014 in American music
Concert tours of the United States
September 2014 events in the United States
Tour 2014